Eric Crocker (born May 20, 1987) is a former American football cornerback. He was signed as an undrafted free agent by the Talons in 2012. He played college football at the University of Arkansas at Monticello.

Early years
Crocker grew up in Stockton, California where he witnessed crime in his neighborhood at a young age but decided to turn to sports for a positive path. He attended Tokay High School in Lodi, California where he played football and also played basketball and ran track and field.

College career
He attended Modesto Junior College for one year. He also was awarded Golden Gate First-team All-Conference Honors. He earned a scholarship and finished college at division II University of Arkansas-Monticello. Crocker was named to the Great American All-Conference Team as a senior

Professional career

San Antonio Talons
He signed with the San Antonio Talons of the Arena Football League as an undrafted free agent. He finished the 2012 AFL season with 70 tackles, 2 forced fumbles, 3 fumble recoveries, and 3 interceptions.

New York Jets
On March 1, 2013, he signed with the New York Jets. He was released on August 4, 2013.

Portland Thunder
On December 20, 2013, Crocker was selected by the Portland Thunder in the 2014 AFL Expansion Draft.

San Jose SaberCats
On September 29, 2014, Crocker was assigned to the San Jose SaberCats.

Personal life
His father, who died in June 2013, was Brian Crocker. His mother is Elnora Rucker. He has one brother named Brian Crocker, Jr. and has three sisters named Jade, Diamond and Belicia Crocker. He has a son named Jayden "Juice" Crocker with ex-girlfriend Lorianne Prado. He is married to Styvie Angelo and inherited one boy David “Dee” and Styvie and Eric have a baby together named Dilynn and Eric has at least one more girl named Shayne from a previous relationship and now lives in Arkansas

References

External links
New York Jets bio

1987 births
Living people
Players of American football from Stockton, California
American football cornerbacks
Modesto Pirates football players
Arkansas–Monticello Boll Weevils football players
San Antonio Talons players
New York Jets players
Portland Thunder players
San Jose SaberCats players